The Hotel Oregon in McMinnville, Oregon, was originally opened in 1905 as the Hotel Elberton. The hotel, built in the Richardsonian Romanesque architectural style, remains the tallest building in downtown McMinnville. In 1999, the property was renovated and reopened as McMenamins Hotel Oregon, the largest historic hotel building in Yamhill County.

The Hotel Oregon hosts an annual UFO convention, where the location is decorated with relics of the building's history and the town's famous 1950 UFO sighting.

References

1905 establishments in Oregon
Buildings and structures in McMinnville, Oregon
McMenamins
Hotels in Oregon
National Register of Historic Places in Yamhill County, Oregon
Hotels established in 1905